Tekağaç is a village in the Besni District, Adıyaman Province, Turkey. Its population is 289 (2021).

The hamlets of Beşir, Bostancık and Yazıyalankoz are attached to the village.

References

Villages in Besni District